Kenny Adamson (born 21 August 1988) is a Scottish professional football defender who plays for Kelty Hearts. Adamson has previously played for Livingston, as well as having a ten-year spell with Cowdenbeath.

Career

Livingston
A member of Livingston's under 19 squad, Adamson made his first team debut as a substitute on 14 April 2007, in a 1–1 draw with Queen of the South in the Scottish First Division. In all he made 3 appearances in his debut season.

Cowdenbeath
In May 2007, Adamson signed for Scottish Second Division side Cowdenbeath. He made his debut on 4 August 2007, in a 1–1 draw with Berwick Rangers. In all he made 36 Appearances in his debut season. He scored his first goal for the club the following season on 20 December 2008, in a 4–1 win over East Stirlingshire.

He was sent off for the first time in his career on 8 August 2009, in a 2–1 defeat to Arbroath. In all he was dismissed three times that season as they won promotion to the Scottish First Division.

On 13 March 2012, Adamson signed a new contract extending his stay until May 2013. Adamson was part of the Cowdenbeath side which suffered back-to-back relegation from the Scottish Championship to Scottish League Two. Due to injury, Adamson missed all of the 2016–17 season with his final match for the club coming in the Scottish League One semi-final against Queen's Park on 7 May 2016.

Kelty Hearts
Adamson signed for Kelty Hearts on 1 June 2017, dropping down to the SJFA East Superleague.

Career statistics

References

External links

1988 births
Living people
Footballers from Dunfermline
Scottish footballers
Association football defenders
Livingston F.C. players
Cowdenbeath F.C. players
Kelty Hearts F.C. players
Scottish Football League players
Scottish Professional Football League players